Agdistis bennetii is a moth of the family Pterophoridae found in Europe. It inhabits salt marshes.

Description
The wingspan is 24–30 mm. Adults are greyish brown. There are two generations per year, with adults on wing from mid-May to the beginning of July and again from mid-July to mid-September.

The larvae feed on common sea-lavender (Limonium vulgare) and rock sea-lavender (Limonium binervosum) feeding on the undersides of the leaves.

Distribution
Agdistis bennetti has been recorded in the coastal areas of Great Britain, Denmark, Belgium, the Netherlands, France, Germany, Spain, Italy, Albania, and the former Yugoslavia.

References

External links
 Lepiforum e. V.

Agdistinae
Moths of Europe
Moths described in 1833